Imputor? is an independent record label founded in 1999 by Darrin Wiener (aka Plastiq Phantom) and Jordan Snodgrass.  Originally based in Seattle and San Diego, Imputor? began releasing experimental electronic music (also known as Intelligent dance music or IDM), and has since expanded into styles such as Indie rock and Comedy.  Imputor? moved its base of operations to Portland, Oregon.

History
The duo had first met 7 years earlier while attending high-school together in Vista, California, a suburb located in North San Diego County.

The name Imputor? is said to be a made-up contraction of the phrase "I am a computer."  It was inspired by the title track Select Imputor? from Plastiq Phantom's debut CD-R EP which was released by the label in 1999.

The official logo of the label is a 5.25" floppy disk, a nostalgic relic from the founders' childhood exposure to computers.

In addition to releasing its own records, Imputor? has distributed other labels including Neverstop, Razler Records, and Mass Mvmnt

Artists
 Aspects of Physics
 Calculator Man & Hangar
 Dalmatians
 Datascraper
 Diagram of Suburban Chaos
 DJs On Strike!
 El Poeta
 FCS North
 Halicon
 Masterdome
 Nando Costa
 Otto Von Schirach
 Plastiq Phantom
 Pleaseeasaur
 Psychic Emperor
 Scientific American
 Sindri
 T. Roberts
 The Snodgrass
 Vells
 World Gang

See also
 List of companies based in Oregon

External links
 Official site
 Imputor? at Discogs.com

Record labels established in 1999
American independent record labels
Experimental music record labels
Electronic music record labels
Indie rock record labels
Companies based in Portland, Oregon
1999 establishments in the United States